René-Jean Chauffard (24 August 1920 – 30 October 1972) was a French film actor. He appeared in 40 films between 1945 and 1972.

Selected filmography
 Girl with Grey Eyes (1945)
 The Ideal Couple (1946)
 Les Amants du pont Saint-Jean (1947)
 Three Telegrams (1950)
 Paris Vice Squad (1951)
 Le Secret d'Hélène Marimon (1954)
 Blood and Roses (1960)
 Jealous as a Tiger (1964)
The Lion's Share (1971)

External links

1920 births
1972 deaths
French male film actors
Male actors from Paris
20th-century French male actors